Jamie Magnus Stone (born 15 December 1985) is a Scottish film director and animator, who studied at the National Film and Television School. He is the son of Sally Magnusson and grandson of Magnus Magnusson and Mamie Baird.

Career 
Stone studied film and television at the Edinburgh College of Art where he made his first films; Flights, about an old man and his flight of stairs, and the Scottish BAFTA nominated Fritz about a German Spy who lives under a boy's bed. Whilst directing fiction films, he also developed his skills in sand animation and won the MacLaren Award at the Edinburgh Film Festival and Best Animation at BAFTA Scotland in 2008 for his series of Three Minute Wonders, The World According To, produced by Anders Jedenfors.

Stone enrolled at the National Film and Television School in 2010. He was interviewed by The Guardian in 2010 after making his first year film, Far Removed.

In March 2010, Stone directed two music videos for Tommy Reilly, "Make the Bed" and "Take Me Away".

He wrote and directed Sh-Boom in February 2011 which was premiered at the NFTS' Stars of Tomorrow Screening at BAFTA in September 2011. The film was shot entirely in a bin besides a dramatic opening sequence involving a bride on fire.

In August 2011, Stone directed his graduation film, Skyborn, about a father and son stuck in a foggy post apocalyptic wasteland. Stone also wrote and directed the screenplay. It was screened at the BFI in March 2012 as part of the NFTS' graduation ceremony. The film was shot in constant fog and involved flying machines, pyrotechnics, miniatures and chickens.

In August 2014, Stone was nominated for a BAFTA for his short film Orbit Ever After.

In November 2019, Stone was announced as one of the directors for the twelfth series of Doctor Who. He directed two filming blocks, consisting of four episodes, including "Spyfall, Part 1", "Praxeus", "Ascension of the Cybermen", and "The Timeless Children". Stone returned to direct for the thirteenth series, with the episodes "The Halloween Apocalypse", "War of the Sontarans", and "Village of the Angels", as well as "The Power of the Doctor", the final episode in a trio of subsequent specials.

In May 2022, the BBC and STAN commissioned a new series to be directed by Stone, Ten Pound Poms, a drama about the British citizens who migrated to Australia after the Second World War, with filming commencing in Australia shortly after.

References

External links

1985 births
Living people
Scottish film directors
Scottish people of Icelandic descent
Alumni of the National Film and Television School
Alumni of the Edinburgh College of Art